Photographs & Tidalwaves is the first (and only) album by the band Holland; soon afterwards, they were forced by legal reasons to change their name. Along with their new name of The Lonely Hearts, they also changed some of their lineup and musical style.

Track listing

 "The Whole World"
 "I’m Not Backing Down"
 "Shine Like Stars"
 "Because of You"
 "One Minute To Zero"
 "Call It a Day"
 "The West Coast"
 "Bring Back July"
 "Genetics"
 "Losing Jim"
 "Goodnight Texas"
 "Photographs and Tidalwaves"

References

2003 debut albums
The Lonely Hearts albums
Tooth & Nail Records albums
Albums produced by Aaron Sprinkle